Thomas Burgess (1 October 1859 – 15 February 1922) was an English first-class cricketer, who played one match for Yorkshire against Essex in Harrogate in 1895.  A right-handed batsman, he failed to score a run in the match, and did not bowl his right arm fast medium either, as Essex won a tight match by 16 runs.

Born in Harrogate, Yorkshire, England, Burgess died aged 62, in February 1922.

References

External links
 Cricinfo Profile

1859 births
1922 deaths
Yorkshire cricketers
Cricketers from Harrogate
English cricketers
English cricketers of 1890 to 1918